The Governorate of Dalmatia was a territory divided into three provinces of Italy during the Italian Kingdom and Italian Empire epoch. It was created later as an entity in April 1941 at the start of World War II in Yugoslavia, by uniting the existing Province of Zara together with occupied Yugoslav territory annexed by Italy after the invasion of Yugoslavia by the Axis powers and the signing of the Rome Treaties.

Background

Dalmatia was a strategic region during World War I that both Italy and Serbia intended to seize from Austria-Hungary. Italy joined the Triple Entente Allies in 1915 upon agreeing to the London Pact that guaranteed Italy the right to annex a large portion of Dalmatia in exchange for Italy's participation on the Allied side. From  5 to 6 November 1918, Italian forces were reported to have reached Lissa, Lagosta, Sebenico, and other localities on the Dalmatian coast. At the end of hostilities in November 1918, the Italian military had seized control of the entire portion of Dalmatia that had been guaranteed to Italy by the London Pact and by 17 November, it had seized Fiume as well. In 1918, Admiral Enrico Millo declared himself the Italian governor of Dalmatia. The famous Italian nationalist Gabriele d'Annunzio supported the seizure of Dalmatia and proceeded to Zadar in an Italian warship in December 1918.

However, in spite of the guarantees of the London Pact to Italy of a large portion of Dalmatia and Italian military occupation of claimed territories of Dalmatia, both the peace settlement negotiations of 1919 to 1920 and the Fourteen Points of Woodrow Wilson, who advocated self-determination, took precedence, with Italy being permitted to annex only Zadar from Dalmatia, with the rest of Dalmatia being part of Yugoslavia. Enraged Italian nationalists considered the decision to be a betrayal of the promises of the London Pact.

Characteristics
The Governorate of Dalmatia was made up of parts of coastal Yugoslavia that were occupied and annexed by Italy from April 1941 to September 1943, together with the prewar Italian Province of Zara on the Dalmatian coast, including the island of Lagosta (Lastovo) and the island of Saseno, now Albania, and totalling about 200 square kilometres, which Italy had possessed since 1919. The town of Zara (Zadar), which had included most of the Italian population of Dalmatia since the beginning of the 20th century and was largely Italian-speaking, was designated as its capital.

The creation of the Governorate of Dalmatia fulfilled the demands of Italian irredentism, but not all of Dalmatia was annexed by Italy, as the Italian-German quasi-protectorate known as the Independent State of Croatia took parts of it. Nevertheless, the Italian army maintained de facto control over the whole of Dalmatia.

The Kingdom of Italy divided the Governorate in three Italian provinces: Zara (Zadar), Spalato (Split) and Cattaro (Kotor). Officially, however, no Italian region was ever created with the name "Dalmatia". While the Governorate was not called a region of Italy, the northern Dalmatian islands of Veglia (Krk) and Arbe (Rab) were administratively united to the Italian province of Fiume (now Rijeka) and became areas of Italy.

In September 1941, Italy's fascist dictator, Benito Mussolini, ordered the military occupation of the entire Dalmatian coast, including the city of Dubrovnik ("Ragusa"), and islands such as Vis (Lissa) and Pag (Pago) which had been given to the puppet Independent State of Croatia of Ante Pavelić: Mussolini tried to annex those areas to the Governorship of Dalmatia, but was temporarily stopped by the strong opposition of Pavelić, who retained nominal control of them.

Fascist Italy even occupied Marindol and other villages that had previously belonged to the Banovina of Croatia, Milić-Selo, Paunović-Selo, Žunić-Selo, Vukobrati, Vidnjevići and Vrhovci. In 1942 these villages were annexed to Cernomegli (now Črnomelj, in Slovenia), which was then part of the Italian Province of Lubiana, even though their population was not Slovene but Serbian.

The governorship was held until January 1943 by Giuseppe Bastianini, when he was recalled to Italy to join the cabinet, his place as governor being taken by Francesco Giunta.

The Governorate of Dalmatia was cancelled administratively by Badoglio on August 19, 1943: it was substituted by direct rule of the 3 "Prefetti" governing the provinces of Zara, Spalato and Cattaro.

After the Kingdom of Italy changed sides to the Allies in 1943, German forces took over the area. The territory was not given to the fascist Italian Social Republic, which was a puppet state of Germany, but was instead completely dissolved and added to the puppet Independent State of Croatia.

However, Zara (and the surrounding territory that was the original Provincia italiana di Zara until 1941) remained Italian (even if under nominal control and protection of the German Army) until 1945. The city was exposed to bombings between November 1943 and October 1944: the Allies documented 30 bombing raids, while contemporary Italian accounts claim 54; fatalities recorded range from nearly 1,000, up to as many as 4,000 of the city's 20,000 inhabitants and 60% of the city's buildings were fully destroyed.

On October 30, 1944, the last Italian authority in Dalmatia  the Zara prefect Vincenzo Serrentino  left the destroyed city with the remaining Dalmatian Italians . Nearly 89% of the Zara buildings & installations were destroyed and so  the city was called the "Dresden of Italy"

Territory

The Governorate of Dalmatia consisted of three provinces: province of Zara, province of Spalato and Province of Cattaro. The administrative capital was Zara.

After the autumn of 1941 the Dalmatian islands of Pag (Pago), Brač (Brazza) and Hvar (Lesina), part of the Independent State of Croatia, were occupied by the Italian army, along with an area of Croatia which was away from the coast of Sinj towards the center of Bosnia, near Sarajevo and Banja Luka. However these were not formally annexed to the Governorate.

Demographics

The Dalmatian Governatorate contained 390,000 inhabitants, of which 280,000 Croats, 90,000 Serbs and 5,000 Italians.

Governors of Dalmatia
 Athos Bartolucci (16 April 1941 – 6 June 1941)
 Giuseppe Bastianini (7 June 1941 – 14 February 1943)
 Francesco Giunta (14 February 1943 – 19 August 1943)

See also
 Dalmatian Italians
 Italian occupation of France

Notes and references

Notes

References 

20th century in Italy
History of Dalmatia
Italian irredentism
Italians of Croatia
Italy–Yugoslavia relations
Yugoslavia in World War II
Former governorates of Italy
1941 establishments in the Italian Empire
1943 disestablishments in the Italian Empire
States and territories disestablished in 1941
States and territories disestablished in 1943
1941 establishments in Croatia
1943 disestablishments in Croatia
Adriatic question